Khujadze is a Georgian surname. Notable people with the surname include:

 Dato Khujadze (born 1975), Georgian singer
 Shalva Khujadze (born 1975), Georgian footballer

Georgian-language surnames